The siege of Ravenna of 539-540 took place during Justinian’s Gothic War. After clearing out Ariminum, Urviventus, Urbinus and Auximus the road to Ravenna was open to the Byzantines. In late 539 or early 540 Belisarius, victor of engagements like Dara, Ad Decimum and Rome, marched on Ravenna while Vitalius was already in the area. Vitalius discovered a grain shipment destined for Ravenna and captured it. When news of the siege spread many Gothic garrisons began to surrender. The city itself was taken when Belisarius was offered the Ostrogothic throne and faked acceptance.

Background 

During the early part of the Gothic War, the Byzantine conquest of Italy, the Byzantines quickly captured a vast amount of land. among the captured cities was Rome which the Goths attempted to retake in a siege. During the Siege of Rome, the Byzantine commander John, successfully took Ariminum. This threatened the Gothic capital Ravenna so the Goths lifted the siege and moved against John. After successfully holding out against the Goths in Ariminum and capturing Urviventus, Urbinus, Fisula and Auximus, slowed down by fierce resistance at Auximus and the insubordination of Narses and John, the Byzantines were ready to march on Ravenna. Meanwhile Byzantine forces were campaigning too in Dalmatia, and Vitalius moved up from there poised also to threaten the Gothic capital.

Siege

Starting negotiations 
In late 539 or early 540 Belisarius advanced to Ravenna. A large force, commanded by Magnus, was sent to patrol the south bank of the Po River and threaten Ravenna from another direction. At the same time Vitalius was advancing from Dalmatia, arriving in a position to patrol the north bank of the Po. For unknown reasons the river had fallen to such a low level that ships, meant to supply Ravenna, were unable to proceed and were subsequently captured by Vitalius’ forces. When the water rose again Vitalius sent the grain to Belisarius, who distributed it among Byzantine troops. Byzantine dominance on sea prevented the Goths from shipping any other grain to the city. Seeing how desperate the Gothic position was becoming Theudibert, king of the Franks, offered help to Witigis, the Gothic king, in return for a peaceful division of Italy. Hearing of the Frankish proposal, Belisarius sent an envoy of his own. The Byzantine envoy pointed out the oppression of the Thuringians and Burgundians by Frankish kings and the betrayal the Franks had committed earlier in the war, when they attacked the Goths with whom they were until then allied, an alliance made in secret despite an already existing one with the Byzantines. Witigis decided to take his chances with the Byzantines instead of with the Franks.

Final relief attempt 
While Witigis was still deliberating, Belisarius sent Vitalius to Venetia in order to capture as many settlements as possible. At around the same time the grain stores in Ravenna caught fire. This was possibly caused by Byzantine agents or arranged by Matasuintha, queen of the Ostrogoths, who had been forced to marry Witigis. Another possible cause of the fire was lightning. Hearing of the siege the Gothic garrisons in the Cotian Alps decided to surrender. Belisarius accepted the surrender and sent troops to occupy the region. Uraias, a Gothic commander who had earlier fallen victim to the treachery of the Frank and been defeated in a surprise attack, now marched with an army of 4.000 men to relieve the city. When the Byzantines occupied the Cotian Alps, many of the families of Uraias’ soldiers came in danger of being captured, forcing him to march there instead. Uraias besieged the Byzantine-Gothic army. Another Byzantine army moved into the area, leading to the families of Uraias’ troops being captured anyway and his army disintegrating. Now there was no hope of Ravenna being relieved but the city was impregnable by land and ship, so it had to be starved out or taken by bribery or trickery.

Gothic surrender 
A message from Justinian arrived, a light peace-deal, offering Witigis kingship over the territory north of the Po as the emperor’s vassal. As commander in the field Belisarius had to ratify it for it to go into effect but he refused to do so. The Gothic nobility was afraid of a peace-deal with the Byzantines as they would most likely be deported to the east of the empire, forced to fight the Sasanians. They secretly offered Belisarius the western imperial throne, when Witigis found out he voiced his support. Belisarius accepted the deal and made all pledges required of him by it except ones about the western throne, which he said he would make in the presence of Witigis. In May 540 Belisarius entered Ravenna, taking it for the east instead of the west. After he let the surrendered Goths go home, the Byzantines outnumbered the Goths in their former capitol. Upon hearing of the fall of the Ravenna the last remaining Gothic forces offered their surrender to Belisarius.

Aftermath

References 

Ravenna 539
Ravenna 539
Ravenna
Gothic War (535–554)
Ravenna
Ravenna
539
540
Ravenna